Samantha Dawn Murray Sharan (née Murray; born 9 October 1987) is a British tennis player.

Murray has won four singles titles and 26 doubles titles on the ITF Women's Circuit. On 23 September 2013, she reached her best singles ranking of world No. 165. On 22 August 2022, she peaked at No. 76 in the doubles rankings.

Murray made her WTA Tour debut at the 2011 Eastbourne Classic, losing to Anna Tatishvili in the first round.

She is not related to tennis player Andy Murray.

Personal life
Murray married Indian tennis doubles specialist Divij Sharan in July 2019.

Grand Slam performance timelines

Singles

Doubles

ITF Circuit finals

Singles: 10 (4 titles, 6 runner–ups)

Doubles: 45 (26 titles, 19 runner-ups)

References

External links

 
 

1987 births
Living people
Sportspeople from Stockport
British female tennis players
Northwestern Wildcats women's tennis players
Universiade medalists in tennis
English female tennis players
Tennis people from Greater Manchester
Universiade bronze medalists for Great Britain